Ingrid Auerswald ( Brestrich, born 2 September 1957 in Jena, East Germany) is a retired German athlete who competed mainly in the 100 metres.

Biography
Brestrich-Lange competed for East Germany in the 1980 Summer Olympics held in Moscow in the 100 metres where she finished third behind Lyudmila Kondratyeva and East German teammate Marlies Göhr. She then joined with Göhr and fellow East Germans Romy Müller and Bärbel Wöckel to win gold in the 4 × 100 metres relay.

Due to the Eastern Bloc countries boycotting the Los Angeles Olympics, Auerswald missed the 1984 Games, but returned in the 1988 Seoul Olympics to team up again with Marlies Göhr as well as Silke Möller and Kerstin Behrendt to finish second behind the USA team.

See also
 German all-time top lists – 100 metres

References

1957 births
Living people
Sportspeople from Jena
People from Bezirk Gera
East German female sprinters
Olympic athletes of East Germany
World Athletics Championships athletes for East Germany
Athletes (track and field) at the 1980 Summer Olympics
Athletes (track and field) at the 1988 Summer Olympics
Olympic gold medalists for East Germany
Olympic silver medalists for East Germany
Olympic bronze medalists for East Germany
East German sportspeople in doping cases
World Athletics Championships medalists
European Athletics Championships medalists
Medalists at the 1988 Summer Olympics
Medalists at the 1980 Summer Olympics
Olympic gold medalists in athletics (track and field)
Olympic silver medalists in athletics (track and field)
Olympic bronze medalists in athletics (track and field)
Recipients of the Patriotic Order of Merit in silver
World Athletics Championships winners
Olympic female sprinters